Edgar Daniel Burch (February 15, 1894 – December 5, 1957) was an American Negro league pitcher in the 1910s.

A native of Jeffersonville, Indiana, Burch made his Negro leagues debut in 1914 with the French Lick Plutos and Indianapolis ABCs. He went on to play for the Louisville White Sox and Leland Giants, and finished his career in 1917 with the All Nations club. Burch died in his hometown of Jeffersonville in 1957 at age 63.

References

External links
 and Seamheads

1894 births
1957 deaths
All Nations players
French Lick Plutos players
Indianapolis ABCs players
Leland Giants players
Louisville White Sox players
20th-century African-American sportspeople